County Line Bridge, also known as Hancock County Bridge #105, is a historic Parker through-truss bridge located in Blue River Township, Hancock County, Indiana and Ripley Township, Rush County, Indiana.  It was built in 1916 and spans the Big Blue River into Rush County, Indiana.  It measures 200 feet long and has a clearance of 15 feet, 5 inches.

It was listed on the National Register of Historic Places in 1994.

References

Road bridges on the National Register of Historic Places in Indiana
Bridges completed in 1916
Transportation buildings and structures in Hancock County, Indiana
National Register of Historic Places in Hancock County, Indiana
Bridges in Rush County, Indiana
National Register of Historic Places in Rush County, Indiana
Parker truss bridges in the United States